La Bréole (Vivaro-Alpine: La Breula) is a former commune in the Alpes-de-Haute-Provence department in southeastern France. On 1 January 2017, it was merged into the new commune Ubaye-Serre-Ponçon.

Population

See also
Communes of the Alpes-de-Haute-Provence department

References

Former communes of Alpes-de-Haute-Provence
Alpes-de-Haute-Provence communes articles needing translation from French Wikipedia
Populated places disestablished in 2017